Dušan Žanko (10 November 1904, Trilj, Kingdom of Dalmatia – 23 January 1980, Caracas) was a Croatian writer, professor, diplomat and the intendant of the Croatian National Theatre in Zagreb from 1941 to 1943. Professor at Andrés Bello Catholic University, Central University of Venezuela and Faculty of Agronomy in Maracay.

He graduated from the Franciscan Classical Gymnasium in Široki Brijeg in 1924. During this time he was a member of the Croatian Eagles Association. He graduated in history from the University of Zagreb in 1928. He subsequently worked as a gymnasium professor in Zagreb. In the 1930s he was one of the leaders of the Crusader Brotherhood in Croatia, and was also active in Catholic Action. 

From 22 April 1941 to 8 November 1943 he was intendant of the Croatian National Theatre in Zagreb. During his time as intendant, he led Zagreb's opera company on performances in Venice, Florence and Rome in April 1942 and to Vienne in 1943. In January 1943, Bucharest's opera singers guested at the theatre, performing Aida and Carmen. After his stint at the theatre, he was employed in the Ministry of Foreign Affairs as a cultural-economic representative to France. 

On 6 May 1945 Žanko emigrated. He spent the next few years at the displaced persons camp near Fermo, Italy whose inhabitants were more of 2000 Croats displaced from Yugoslavia. On 4 October 1946 the Yugoslav communist government requested his return to face trial, but the request was never carried out. In 1948 he moved to Argentina, before settling in Venezuela in 1954. In emigration he was active in the magazine Hrvatska revija and was president of the printing house Zajednica izdanja Ranjeni labud.  At The Catholic University Andrés Bello, Caracas, teaches the "History of the Ideas" (from 1954 to 1956) [1] and works as a librarian. Since 1961 he has been a professor of humanities at the Central University of Venezuela and at the Agronomy Faculty in Maracay, where he has taught bibliographic documentation and technical communication.
He attended the canonization of Nikola Tavelić in Rome on 21 June 1970. Žanko attended the founding of the Croatian National Council in Toronto in 1974 and remained a member of the organization until his death. In the bibliography of prof. Žanko's works there are about 80 theatrical reviews, reviews and presentations, 76 literary reviews and reviews, 36 articles of religious content, 36 essays, 87 other articles, three songs and three books.
For his work and contribution to the development of the country, Venezuelan President Carlos Andrés Pérez was honored in 1978 by the star of the Order of Francisco de Miranda 2nd Class.

Notes

References
Svjedoci : domovinsko izdanje. Knjižnica Hrvatske revije. Zagreb, 1998.
Zbornik radova o skupu Povratak Dušana Žanka u zavičaj. Sinj, 1995.
[1]  Žanko Dušan, Prof. (1904-1980), Historia de Studia Croatica, http://historiadestudiacroatica.blogspot.com/2015/08/zanko-dusan-prof-1904-1980.html

1904 births
1980 deaths
People from Trilj
People from the Kingdom of Dalmatia
Croatian writers
Yugoslav emigrants to Venezuela